Tommy Sten Kristoffersson, actually Tommy Sten Kristoffersen, (born 1 May 1959 in Eda) is a Swedish race car driver whose father hails from Denmark. In the beginning of his career he competed in rallycross for Audi before starting a team in the Swedish Touring Car Championship (STCC) in 1998 running Audi A4 Quattros with himself as one of the drivers. Tommy Kristoffersson has competed for his team from 1998 to 2008, finishing 4th overall in 1998 and 2001. He retired from the STCC before the start of the 2009 season, as Kristoffersson Motorsport was struggling in the championship three years after Audi pulled out from backing his team.

As of 2015 he is the team principal of Volkswagen Team Sweden, taking part in the FIA World Rallycross Championship.

Racing record

Complete FIA European Rallycross Championship results

Division 2*

* ''Division 2 was rebranded as Division 1 in 1997.

Division  1

Personal life

He is the father of touring car driver and world rallycross champion Johan Kristoffersson.

References

External links

STCC Official History

Swedish racing drivers
Swedish Touring Car Championship drivers
1959 births
Living people